Loxobates is a genus of spiders in the family Thomisidae. It was first described in 1877 by Tamerlan Thorell. , it contains 9 Asian species.

Species
Loxobates comprises the following species:
Loxobates castetsi (Simon, 1906) - India
Loxobates daitoensis Ono, 1988 - China, Japan
Loxobates ephippiatus Thorell, 1877 - Indonesia (Sulawesi)
Loxobates kapuri (Tikader, 1980) - India
Loxobates kawilus Barrion & Litsinger, 1995 - Philippines
Loxobates masapangensis Barrion & Litsinger, 1995 - Philippines
Loxobates minor Ono, 2001 - Bhutan, China
Loxobates ornatus Thorell, 1891 - Malaysia
Loxobates quinquenotatus Thorell, 1895 - Myanmar

References

Thomisidae
Thomisidae genera
Spiders of Asia
Taxa named by Tamerlan Thorell